Weld County School District RE-1 is a school district headquartered in Gilcrest, Colorado.  the district had 1,990 students. The district also serves LaSalle and Platteville.

In 2012 the district began utilizing EAGLE-Net Alliance, a broadband internet cooperative involving several local governments in the state that is intended to increase the proliferation of broadband internet. One member of the group's board of directors, Jo Barbie, served as the WCSD RE-1 superintendent.

In the 2012–2013 school year the district began holding classes only four days per week instead of five and therefore the district spent 1.7% less of its original budget, meaning it spent $360,000 fewer dollars. Don Rangel became the superintendent in 2015.

After Rangel was fired, Johan van Nieuwenhuizen was hired in 2019.

In the 2020-2021 school year, North Valley Middle School in LaSalle, Colorado earned the US Department of Education's National Blue Ribbon School award, making this school the only Middle School in Colorado to earn this award.

Schools
 Valley High School
 North Valley Middle School
 South Valley Middle School
 Gilcrest Elementary School
 Pete Mirich Elementary School
 Platteville Elementary School

References

External links
 

School districts in Colorado
Education in Weld County, Colorado